The 2008 San Diego County Credit Union Poinsettia Bowl was the fourth edition of the college football bowl game, and was played at Qualcomm Stadium in San Diego, California.  The game started at 5 PM US PST on Tuesday, December 23, 2008. The game, simulcast on ESPN and ESPN Radio with Rece Davis, Mark May, and Lou Holtz announcing, pit the Boise State Broncos against the Texas Christian Horned Frogs. In the game, TCU overcame a 13–0 deficit to pull off an impressive 17–16 win over Boise State.

With Boise State ranked 9th and TCU ranked 11th, this bowl pairing featured teams both ranked higher than the teams playing in a BCS game during the same season, the 2009 Orange Bowl, which featured #12 Cincinnati against #21 Virginia Tech, a first in BCS history.

TCU and Boise State would face off in a bowl game again the following season when both played in a BCS game, the 2010 Fiesta Bowl.


Scoring summary

References

Poinsettia Bowl
Poinsettia Bowl
Boise State Broncos football bowl games
TCU Horned Frogs football bowl games
December 2008 sports events in the United States
2008 in sports in California
2000s in San Diego